Lars van den Berg (born 7 July 1998 in De Meern) is a Dutch cyclist, who currently rides for UCI WorldTeam . His brother Marijn van den Berg is also a cyclist.

Major results

2015
 3rd Road race, National Junior Road Championships
2016
 6th Trofeo Buffoni
 7th Grand Prix Bati-Metallo
2017
 1st Young rider classification Ronde de l'Oise
 6th Overall Carpathian Couriers Race
 10th Overall Bałtyk–Karkonosze Tour
2018
 10th Paris–Tours Espoirs
2019
 1st Young rider classification Flèche du Sud
 3rd Overall Olympia's Tour
 10th Overall Tour de l'Avenir
 10th Overall Kreiz Breizh Elites
 10th Overall Rhône-Alpes Isère Tour
2020
 8th Ster van Zwolle
2021
 4th Paris–Camembert

Grand Tour general classification results timeline

Notes

References

External links

1998 births
Living people
Dutch male cyclists
Sportspeople from Utrecht (city)
Cyclists from Utrecht (province)